"Dead Horse" is a song by American rock band Guns N' Roses. It appears on their 1991 release, Use Your Illusion I. The composition starts out with an acoustic section, which features a guitar riff written by lead vocalist Axl Rose. Following the sound of a nutcracker, the electric guitars soon come in for the heavier section which dominates the song. After the final climactic chorus, the opening section is reprised for another bar. The song ends with an audio effect featuring the song being fast-forwarded.

The song was never released as a single but was issued to radio stations in 1993 as a 5" CD radio promo.  A music video made in 1993, directed by Louis Marciano, first appeared on the VHS only release entitled Garden of Eden: Strictly Limited Edition and later on the Welcome to the Videos compilation in 1998.

Personnel
Guns N' Roses
 W. Axl Rose – lead vocals, acoustic guitar
 Slash – lead guitar
 Izzy Stradlin – rhythm guitar
 Duff McKagan – bass
 Matt Sorum – drums
Additional musicians
 Mike Clink – nutcracker

References

Guns N' Roses songs
1991 songs
Songs written by Axl Rose